Sirdar v The Army Board (1999) C-273/97 is a UK labour law case concerning genuine occupational requirements for a job.

Facts
Ms Sirdar was refused a position in the marines, and made redundant from position as chef. In the marines there had to be interoperability, so all marine members had to be capable of combat. There was a ban on combat for women.

Judgment
The ECJ held Member States ‘depending on the circumstances, national authorities have a certain degree of discretion when adopting measures which they consider to be necessary in order to guarantee public security in a Member State’. Because marines were the ‘point of the arrow head’ the competent authorities were justified in having it be exclusively male.

See also

UK labour law
UK employment equality law

Notes

References

United Kingdom labour case law
Court of Justice of the European Union case law
1999 in case law
1999 in British law
European Union labour case law